Francesco Finocchio (born 30 April 1992) is an Italian footballer, who is playing for Serie D club Luparense.

Biography

Parma
Finocchio joined third-tier side Cremonese from Parma on loan in the summer of 2011 in a year-long deal. However, Finocchio endured a frustrating period at the club, playing just 14 minutes of football before January, which eventually saw him move back to Parma early in January 2012. In the same month he left for Fondi.

In June 2012 Finocchio joined Bologna F.C. 1909 with Riccardo Casini moved to opposite direction. Both clubs also retained 50% registration rights. Half of the "card" of Finocchio and Casini were valued €1 million. On 7 July he left for FeralpiSalò. In June 2013 both Parma and Bologna bought back their youth product for the same price. Finocchio signed a 5-year contract. In July 2013 he was signed by Serie B club Trapani. On 17 January 2014 the loan to was terminated.  He then left for Gorica.

On 4 July 2014 he was signed by Pisa in a temporary deal, with an option to sign. Finocchio became a free agent on 25 June 2015.

Renate
In August 2017 Finocchio was signed by Renate an ambitious club in Italian third division.

Mantova
On 20 August 2019, he moved to Mantova.

Luparense
On 11 December 2020 he joined Serie D club Luparense.

International career
Finocchio played twice in 2009 UEFA European Under-17 Football Championship.

References

External links
FIGC 

 AIC profile (data by football.it) 

1992 births
Living people
People from Caserta
Italian footballers
Parma Calcio 1913 players
U.S. Cremonese players
S.S. Racing Club Fondi players
FeralpiSalò players
Trapani Calcio players
ND Gorica players
Pisa S.C. players
Pordenone Calcio players
A.C. Renate players
Mantova 1911 players
Serie B players
Slovenian PrvaLiga players
Serie C players
Serie D players
Italian expatriate footballers
Expatriate footballers in Slovenia
Italian expatriate sportspeople in Slovenia
Italy youth international footballers
Association football midfielders
Footballers from Campania
Italian people of Brazilian descent
Sportspeople from the Province of Caserta